RTL 7 is a Dutch free-to-cable television channel that was launched as Veronica on 1 September 1995. RTL 7 is RTL Nederland's "men's channel" with action films, reality television about crime and professions, soccer, motorsport and talk shows about sports. During daytime business and financial news channel RTL Z was broadcasting on RTL 7 until RTL Nederland revamped RTL Z into a 24-hours channel on 7 September 2015.

Officially RTL 7 along with RTL 4, RTL 5 and RTL 8 is headquartered in Hilversum, broadcasting under a Luxembourg TV license. This allows them to avoid more severe control by the Dutch media authorities as Luxembourg's television watchdog is less strict. Yorin used to be licensed in the Netherlands, but moved to Luxembourg after the RTL 7 rebrand. There is a 40 kW DVB-T transmitter on the Dudelange Radio Tower in Luxembourg that broadcasts the channel free-to-air, but the main audience in the Netherlands needs a subscription to a cable, satellite, IPTV, or DVB-T provider to get access. All providers include the channel in their base package.

History

Veronica (1995-2001)
 
The channel began as Veronica on 1 September 1995, and was a joint venture between RTL 4, RTL 5 and Veronica Association (in Dutch: Vereniging Veronica), and with the radio station Hitradio Veronica in the Holland Media Groep.

The Veronica Organisation had been a public broadcasting association since 1 January 1976 but left the Dutch Public Broadcasting system in 1995 and started a commercial channel.

In the first year it broadcasts a lot of American TV series, such as Beverly Hills, 90210, Melrose Place and Baywatch, films, Dutch programmes ranging from game shows to talk shows and Dutch TV series, such as Flodder and Onderweg naar Morgen. By the end of its first year Veronica dropped the news-related programmes and established its place in the Dutch television market as a young adult channel with programmes of a provocative nature. In the next years Veronica proved to be a pioneer in television making by introducing a wide range of reality shows with a real breakthrough when it launched the reality game show Big Brother in 1999.

In 2000 Veronica announced it would leave the joint venture and wanted to start a channel of its own. Eventually, Veronica Association closed a deal with SBS in 2003.

Yorin (2001-2005)

RTL had to change the name of the station. At first RTL came up with ME but a fashion label in the Netherlands WE complained about the similarity with its name. Finally RTL rebranded Veronica to Yorin on 2 April 2001. Yorin referred to the English phrase "You're in". The Dutch version of The Price is Right, Cash en Carlo, referenced this fact when announcer Eddy Keur told contestants "Yorin the game!" when they came on down to Contestant's Row. All programmes previously on Veronica and also the television presenters moved to Yorin. RTL didn't want to add RTL into the name so the channel would keep its own identity.

In the auctioning off of FM radio frequencies called ZeroBase, Holland Media Group acquired a lot allowing them to broadcast a popular music station virtually nationwide; this station was called Yorin FM with its most notable DJs being Rob Stenders, Robert Jensen and Henk Westbroek. In 2006, due to disappointing results, Holland Media Group sold the station to SBS Broadcasting, who rebranded it Caz! and changed the programming to a fully middle-of-the-road all-music formula.

RTL 7 (2005-)

When Dutch media tycoon and Big Brother-inventor John de Mol announced the launch of a TV channel named Talpa, and contracted many popular Dutch TV hosts, the RTL Group felt the need to reorganize its channels. Apart from a physical renewal, the setup of its channels RTL 4, RTL 5 and Yorin were changed. To emphasize the three channels' connection, the name Yorin was replaced by RTL 7 on 12 August 2005. Practically all former Yorin shows were moved to RTL 5, whereas that RTL 5's programmes continued on RTL 7. RTL Z also moved from RTL 5 to RTL 7.

The origin of the number 7, instead of a more logical 6, goes back to 1995 when the original channel Veronica was founded. Around the same time, the commercial channels SBS 6 and TMF appeared and also claimed channel 6 on the remote control. Veronica and TMF lost the battle for remote control button 6. Also, SBS 6 was originally managed by Fons van Westerloo, who later became head of RTL Nederland before the rebranding operation.

On 15 October 2009 RTL Nederland started simulcasting their RTL 7 and RTL 8 channels in 1080i high-definition.

Programming
RTL 7 broadcasts a large number of sports programmes such as football, darts and motorsports, but in which motorsports is their main broadcast item. This include live coverage of Formula One and the MotoGP as the most notable. But also the A1 Grand Prix, Dakar Rally and the Indianapolis 500 are broadcast live on RTL 7. Movies, series and entertainment programmings also broadcast on this channel.

Imported
'Allo 'Allo!
24
The 4400
The A-Team
Alarm für Cobra 11 – Die Autobahnpolizei
Arrested Development
The Beast
The Black Donnellys
The Blacklist
Bakugan: Battle Planet
Baywatch
Beyblade Burst
Billy the Exterminator
Blazing Team: Masters of Yo Kwon Do
Born to Kill?
The Good Guys
Hardcore Pawn
Ice Road Truckers
Inazuma Eleven
Journeyman
K-Ville
Killer Instinct
Knight Rider
Law & Order
Les Dalton
Life on Mars
Married... with Children
Mr. Bean
Muhteşem Yüzyıl
Ninjago
Oggy and the Cockroaches
Pawn Stars
Pokémon
Power Rangers Beast Morphers
Power Rangers Dino Charge
Rescue Me
Resident Advisors
Sons of Anarchy
Spartacus
Stacked
Steven Seagal: Lawman
Strike Back
Transporter: The Series
The Unit
Warehouse 13
Yin Yang Yo!

Sports

Football
UEFA Europa League (2009-2021)
UEFA Champions League (2021-)
Voetbal Inside

Motorsports
24 Hours Nürburgring
24 Hours of Daytona
24 Hours of Le Mans
24 Hours of Zolder
2CV 24 Hour Race
Dubai 24 Hour
Fuji 24 Hours
Longest Day of Nelson
Silverstone Britcar 24-Hour
Spa 24 Hours

Teletext
RTL 7 offered a teletext service which stopped on 1 April 2017. The pages 888/889 are still available for subtitles.

References

External links
RTL 7 

RTL Nederland
Television channels in the Netherlands
Television channels and stations established in 2005